Events from the year 1734 in Denmark.

Incumbents
 Monarch – Christian VI
 Prime minister – Iver Rosenkrantz

Events
 16 April  The County of Christiansholm is established by Christian Raben from the manors of Aalholm, Bramsløkke, Egholm and Stenvængegården.
 25 October  The Royal Danish Nautical Charts Archive is established.

Undated
 The shorter of the two Golden Horns of Gallehus is found close to the place where the first one had been found in 1639.

Births

Deaths

References

 
1730s in Denmark
Denmark
Years of the 18th century in Denmark